Daniels Hill is a prominent solitary nunatak that rises above the ice in the eastern part of the Dyer Plateau of Palmer Land, approximately  west of the head of Clifford Glacier. It was mapped by the United States Geological Survey in 1974, and named by the Advisory Committee on Antarctic Names for Robert Daniels, a United States Antarctic Research Program biologist at Palmer Station, 1975.

References 

Nunataks of Palmer Land